Villa Lagarina is a comune (municipality) in Trentino,  northern Italy, located about  southwest of Trento.

Villa Lagarina borders the following municipalities: Cavedine, Cimone, Arco, Drena, Pomarolo, Ronzo-Chienis, Isera, Rovereto and Nogaredo. Sights include the Lago di Cei and the Castle of Castellano and also the Castle of Noarna (also known as New Castle)

Twin towns
 Bento Gonçalves, Brazil, since  2007
  Stockstadt am Rhein, Germany
  Colonia Manuel Gonzalez Mexico

References

External links
Official website 

Cities and towns in Trentino-Alto Adige/Südtirol